Arnal Llibert Conde Carbó (born 21 January 1980), known simply as Arnal, is a Spanish professional footballer who plays as a forward.

Club career
Born in Girona, Catalonia, Arnal started playing as a senior with RCD Espanyol's reserves in Segunda División B. He made his professional debut with CD Leganés in the 2001–02 season in Segunda División, representing also in that tier Elche CF, UE Lleida, Racing de Ferrol, Girona FC and AD Alcorcón and amassing totals in the competition of 145 games and 17 goals over the course of seven seasons.

Arnal moved abroad for the first time in his career in the summer of 2010, aged nearly 30, and spent the better of the next four years competing in the Cypriot First Division, with AEK Larnaca FC, Doxa Katokopias FC, Alki Larnaca FC and Ethnikos Achna FC. On 21 August 2014, he was a fourth-round pick for Atlético de Kolkata in the inaugural Indian Super League draft.

In the league's opening match on 12 October 2014, Arnal scored the last goal in a 3–0 win over Mumbai City FC.

Club statistics

Honours
Girona
Segunda División B: 2007–08

Atlético Kolkata
Indian Super League: 2014

References

External links

1980 births
Living people
Sportspeople from Girona
Spanish footballers
Footballers from Catalonia
Association football forwards
Segunda División players
Segunda División B players
RCD Espanyol B footballers
CD Leganés players
Elche CF players
UE Lleida players
Racing de Ferrol footballers
Córdoba CF players
UE Sant Andreu footballers
Girona FC players
CE Sabadell FC footballers
UE Olot players
AD Alcorcón footballers
Cypriot First Division players
AEK Larnaca FC players
Doxa Katokopias FC players
Alki Larnaca FC players
Ethnikos Achna FC players
Valletta F.C. players
Indian Super League players
ATK (football club) players
Spanish expatriate footballers
Expatriate footballers in Cyprus
Expatriate footballers in Malta
Expatriate footballers in India
Spanish expatriate sportspeople in Cyprus
Spanish expatriate sportspeople in Malta
Spanish expatriate sportspeople in India